Castling is a surname. Notable people with the surname include:

 Harry Castling (1865–1933), English lyricist
 William Castling (1838–1906), English-born Queensland politician